This list consists of sailors who have competed in sailing at the Summer Olympics.

The number of rows (flags) for each sailor equals the number of times the individual sailor represents their country. The country name behind each flag links to the national team in the specific Summer Olympics.

Legend for images in "Gender" column:  = female,  = male

A

B

C

D

E

F

G

H

I

J

K

L

M

N

O

P

Q

R

S

T

U

V

W

Z

See also
List of 49er class sailors at the Summer Olympics
List of Star class sailors at the Summer Olympics

References 
 
 
 
 
 
 

 
Lists of Olympic competitors